Navalokam is a 1951 Indian Malayalam-language film, directed by V. Krishnan and produced by Pappachan. The film stars Thikkurissy Sukumaran Nair and Miss Kumari in lead roles. The film had musical score by V Dakshinamoorthy.

Cast
 Thikkurissy Sukumaran Nair
 Miss Kumari
 Muthukulam Raghavan Pilla
 Vanchiyoor Madhavan Nair
 Sebastian Kunjukunju Bhagavathar
 Sethulakshmi (Old)
 T. S. Muthaiah

References

External links
 

1950s Malayalam-language films